The Popular Movement for the Liberation of Angola (MPLA) has ruled Angola since independence in 1975. From 1975 to 1991, it was the sole legally existing party in a political system inspired by the model then practised by the socialist countries of Eastern Europe. Since 1991/1992, a multiparty system exists, where the MPLA has been dominant because of the majority it won in the 1992 parliamentary and presidential elections. In the latter, it failed to obtain the required absolute majority for its candidate, José Eduardo dos Santos, and according to the constitution, a second round would have been necessary. The outbreak of the Angolan Civil War made this impossible, and José Eduardo dos Santos exercised presidential functions without a legal basis. For the same reason, the regular parliamentary elections stipulated by the constitution did not take place, and the parliament elected in 1992 remained in place for 16 years. While large sections of the interior were for years controlled by the armed forces of the rival movement National Union for the Total Independence of Angola (UNITA) under the leadership of Jonas Savimbi, UNITA's elected MPs were a regular part of the parliament, and for some years a government of national unity, led by the MPLA, also included members from the UNITA as well as from the National Liberation Front of Angola (FNLA), the third movement that had fought the independence war against Portuguese colonial rule.

In total, in 1992 as well as in 2008, the year of the second parliamentary elections, there were more than 120 registered political parties; only a handful had national constituencies, and only a few of them succeeded in having MPs elected for the National Assembly; see Elections in Angola. After the 2008 elections, all parties that had not succeeded in electing MPs were by law considered as automatically dissolved. Most of them are by now (2011) effectively defunct, while others re-emerged under different names, and still others are still in the process of deciding about their future.

Current parties

Parties represented in the National Assembly

MPLA. UNITA, and FNLA are outcomes of the three nationalist movements that fought the anti-colonial war against Portugal, 1961 to 1974, and then fought each other in the civil war, 1975–2002. While the MPLA became a political party at independence, in 1975, the two others acquired this status in 1991, on the basis of the democratic constitution adopted at that stage. In the 1992 parliamentary elections, the MPLA obtained an absolute majority (53%), but the FNLA, and particularly UNITA, also conquered substantial numbers of seats—keeping the newly formed parties at a distance. However, in the 2008 elections the victory of the MPLA (82%) was overwhelming, so that UNITA (10%) was reduced to the category of a smaller party.

Other parties
Angolan Democratic Forum (Fórum Democrático Angolano, FDA)
Angolan National Democratic Party (Partido Nacional Democrático Angolano, PNDA)
Broad Convergence for the Salvation of Angola – Electoral Coalition (Convergência Ampla de Salvação de Angola – Coligação Eleitoral, CASA-CE)
Democratic Angola – Coalition (Aliança Democrática de Angola, ADA)
Democratic Party for Progress – Angolan National Alliance (Partido Democrático para o Progresso/Aliança Nacional Angolana, PDP-ANA)
Democratic Renewal Party (Partido Renovador Democrático, PRD)
Liberal Democratic Party (Partido Liberal Democrático, PLD)
National Patriotic Alliance (Aliança Patriótica Nacional, APN)
Nationalist Party for Justice in Angola (Partido Nacionalista para a Justiça em Angola, P-NJANGO)
New Democracy Electoral Union (Nova Democracia União Eleitoral ND-UE)
Party of the Alliance of Youth, Workers and Farmers of Angola (Partido da Aliança da Juventude, Operários e Camponeses de Angola, PAJOCA)
Social Democratic Party (Partido Social-Democrata, PSD)
Revelation Party ("Partido da Revelação") (founded 7 July 2007 in London by Angolan young Christians and students)
NB: Only the ND-UE (2) and the PRS (3) have MPs in the National Assembly elected in 2008.

Defunct parties
Angolan Communist Party (Partido Comunista Angolano)
Angolan League (Liga Angolana)
Communist Committee of Cabinda (Comité Communista de Cabinda)
Communist Organization of Angola (Organização Comunista de Angola)
Democratic Front for the Liberation of Angola (FDLA)
 Front for Democracy (Frente para a Democracia, FpD)
Movement for the National Independence of Angola (Movimento para a Independência Nacional de Angola)
Communist Organization of Angola (Organização dos Comunistas de Angola, OCA)
Party of the United Struggle for Africans in Angola (Partido da Luta Unida dos Africanos de Angola'')
NB: With the exception of FpD (now refunded as Democratic Forum (see above), these were not organizations constituted as political parties in terms of the 1991 constitution, and thus did not take part in the 1992 or 2008 election.

See also
 Politics of Angola
 List of political parties by country
 Elections in Angola

Further reading
The recent report by the Chr. Michelsen Institute on political opposition parties and the upcoming 2008 parliamentary elections  is probably the most relevant and authoritative source on Angolan political parties. The study is based on interviews with party officials, newspaper articles and a review of the few reports available on politics and political parties in Angola. Access the CMI report.

Angola
 
Political parties
Political partis
Angola